Debrecen Heliophysical Observatory is an astronomical observatory owned and operated by Konkoly Thege Miklós Astronomical Institute of Hungarian Academy of Sciences.
The Observatory provides solar data and images of observation. Study solar flares and sunspots.

See also
 List of astronomical observatories

References

External links 
Activities of the Debrecen Observatory
Publications of the Heliophysical Observatory since 2000
Heliophysical Observatory, Debrecen, Hungary
Konkoly Observatory, Budapest, Hungary

Astronomical observatories in Hungary
Astrophysics
Plasma physics facilities